Seattle, Washington, United States, the most populous city in the Pacific Northwest region of North America, has 118 completed high-rise buildings over , of which 52 are over  tall. An additional 65 high-rise buildings are under construction or undergoing planning and design review, .

The tallest building in Seattle is the 76-story Columbia Center, which rises  and was completed in 1985. It is currently the 41st-tallest building in the United States, and the tallest building in the state of Washington. The 20 tallest buildings in Washington are all located in Seattle.

History

After the Great Seattle Fire of June 6, 1889, Seattle began reconstruction of the city's central business district under a new building code requiring the use of fireproof materials, such as stone and brick. By the end of 1890, 465 buildings had been built, completing the initial phase of reconstruction, and city boosters looked to build modern high-rise buildings after the infusion of new money from the Klondike gold rush later that decade. The Pioneer Building, whose observation tower surpassed , was completed in 1892 and is regarded as the city's first modern high-rise building.

Seattle's continued growth at the turn of the century, bolstered by the hosting of the Alaska–Yukon–Pacific Exposition in 1909 and the opening of the Metropolitan Tract to development, led to a building boom north of Yesler Way in the modern-day downtown. On July 4, 1914, firearm and typewriter magnate Lyman Cornelius Smith opened the  Smith Tower, the city's new tallest building. For several years, the 38-story tower would hold the title of tallest west of the Mississippi River, and dominate the Seattle skyline. By the end of the 1920s building boom, several new Art Deco high-rises above  were completed in Seattle, including the Medical Dental Building (1925), Seattle Tower (1930), Roosevelt Hotel (1929), Washington Athletic Club (1930), Textile Tower Building (1930), Harborview Medical Center (1931), and Pacific Tower (1933).

New high-rise construction in Seattle was halted during the Great Depression and World War II, and slowed during the post-war economic boom in the 1950s, as suburbanization took hold in the region. The first new building in downtown to be built after the war was the Norton Building in 1959, a 19-story office building in the International Style with a glass curtain wall and simple exterior features, a departure from the previous Neo-Gothic and Art Deco styles used in high-rises. Seattle was selected to host the World's Fair in 1962, revitalizing the downtown area and bringing the construction of the fairgrounds' centerpiece, the Space Needle. The  observation tower became the symbol of the fair and a landmark for Seattle, and was the first new structure to surpass the Smith Tower in height.

The 50-story Seafirst Building (now Safeco Plaza) became the city's tallest when it opened in 1969, standing , and signaled the start of a major construction boom in Downtown Seattle. The boom would last well into the 1980s, despite an economic downturn caused by the Boeing bust and 1970s energy crisis, and introduce elements of Modernist and Postmodern architecture to high-rise construction in the city. In 1984, the 76-story,  Columbia Center was completed, becoming the tallest building in Seattle and on the West Coast of the United States. During the 1980s, the suburb of Bellevue emerged as an urban center, boasting a skyline of its own that would continue to grow well into the 21st century.

The boom of the 1980s was capped by the Columbia Center and other downtown towers such as 1000 Second Avenue (1987), 1201 Third Avenue (1988), the U.S. Bank Centre (1989) and the Gateway Tower (1990), with new downtown office space in the decade surpassing what had been built over the previous 100 years in Seattle. The new wave of development sparked fears of "Manhattanization" in downtown that would push out lower-income residents and reduce quality of life. A downtown land use plan adopted in 1984 and shelved until 1986 required the addition of public benefits for major construction projects. The plan was approved by voters as a ballot initiative on May 16, 1989, replacing the land use plan and introduced the city's modern design review process for new development.

Development of new high-rises slowed down across U.S. cities during the early 1990s recession as demand caught up to an over-built market, with Seattle's 1980s office buildings suffering from a lack of tenants that forced ownership changes or the threat of bankruptcy and foreclosure. By 1992, vacancy rates for office space in Downtown Seattle reached 14.7 percent, while vacancy rates in outlying suburbs remained much lower. After the burst of the dot-com bubble and the early 2000s recession, downtown office vacancies shot up from 1 percent to 13 percent by the end of 2001.

Two major downtown projects, the IDX Tower (2003) and WaMu Center (2006), were completed during the early 2000s and were the first office buildings to be built since the Key Tower in 1990. By the mid-2000s, office vacancies in Downtown Seattle improved to below 10 percent, but office developers were hesitant to break ground on new projects. A new downtown zoning plan adopted in 2006 effectively repealed the 1989 Citizens' Alternative Plan and its modified  height limit, favoring unlimited heights in downtown and  residential towers on the periphery of downtown. The new zoning plan set off a wave of high-rise residential development in the late 2000s, including the completion of Fifteen Twenty-One Second Avenue (2008), Escala (2009), and Olive 8 (2009), coming at the peak of the United States housing bubble and the demand for downtown luxury condominiums before the Great Recession.

During the Great Recession, downtown office vacancies rose to a record 21 percent by the beginning of 2010, but dropped to 10 percent by 2013; the downturn was partially blamed on the collapse of Washington Mutual, which employed 3,500 in its downtown offices. The surge in demand for office space revived several downtown high-rise office projects, including The Mark and Madison Centre, both exceeding  in height and planned to open in 2017.

Recent high-rise development in Seattle has been concentrated in the Denny Triangle and South Lake Union areas to the north of Downtown Seattle, both rezoned to support development in the 2000s after decades of supporting industrial and low-rise commercial establishments. Office development came first to the Denny Triangle area in the mid-2000s, with the construction of the United States Courthouse (2004) and 1918 Eighth Avenue (2009). In 2012, Amazon.com announced their intention to relocate their South Lake Union headquarters to a complex of high-rises in Denny Triangle; the first towers, the  Doppler and Day 1, opened in 2016, and at least three more towers are in development. The Denny Triangle also hosts the region's largest hotel, the 45-story Hyatt Regency Seattle near the Washington State Convention Center, which was completed in 2018.

Residential developments in the Denny Triangle area above  include Aspira (2010), Premiere on Pine, Cirrus, Kinects, Stratus, McKenzie Apartments, and AMLI Arc. The Denny Way corridor in South Lake Union, upzoned in 2013 by the city council, has at least seven high-rise residential buildings above  in height, including the completed Kiara and 1120 Denny Way. Other parts of downtown Seattle have also been host to recent high-rise residential development, including the twin Insignia Towers in Belltown, Tower 12, Helios, and West Edge Tower near Pike Place Market.

Tallest completed buildings 
This includes spires and architectural details but does not include antenna masts. The "Year" column indicates the year in which a building was completed. Freestanding observation towers, while not habitable buildings, are included for comparison purposes; however, they are not ranked.

Tallest under construction, approved and proposed

Under construction

Approved

* Table entries without text indicate that information regarding one or more of building heights, floor counts, and dates of completion has not yet been released.

Proposed

* Table entries without text indicate that information regarding one or more of building heights, floor counts, and dates of completion has not yet been released.

Timeline of tallest buildings

This lists buildings that once held the title of tallest building in Seattle. The Space Needle is not a building, and is thus not included in this list; the  tower was the tallest structure in the city from 1961 to 1969.

Notes
C. The Space Needle is not a habitable building, but is included in this list for comparative purposes. Per a ruling by the Council on Tall Buildings and Urban Habitat, freestanding observation towers are not considered to be buildings, as they are not fully habitable structures.
D. The height of the Pioneer Building was reduced to  after the 1949 Olympia earthquake.

References

General references

 (including individual entries)
 (including individual entries)
 (including individual entries)

Citations

External links
 Diagram of Seattle skyscrapers on SkyscraperPage
 Buildings in Seattle - Emporis.com

Seattle

Tallest In Seattle
Buildings